Land Beyond the Law is a 1937 American Western film directed by B. Reeves Eason and written by Luci Ward and Joseph K. Watson. The film stars Dick Foran, Linda Perry, Wayne Morris, Harry Woods, Irene Franklin and Frank Orth. It was released by Warner Bros. on March 13, 1937.

Plot
In the Old West, Charles "Chip" Douglas becomes the Sheriff of Bitter Creek after his father is killed by cattle rustlers who terrorize the ranchers in an ongoing range war. Chip makes it clear he will protect the ranchers and bring justice to the town.  Louise Turner, daughter of saloon owner, Cattle Kate Turner, is attracted to Chip.

The rustlers continue their reign of terror. Chip is ambushed and taken hostage by the rustlers, led by Tascosa. Deciding to quit Tascosa's gang, Dave Massey and Bandy Malarkey free Chip, who tells them to return to Bitter Creek and raise a posse.

Meanwhile, Chip locates Tascosa and Slade Henaberry as the two make a deal for Henaberry to buy the stolen cattle. A fight ensues during which Henaberry is killed, but Tascosa escapes.  Chip pursues Tascosa, but is slowed down by Tascosa's gang who shoot at him. The posse arrives and a gunfight ensues, during which Tascosa rides away.  Chip catches Tascosa and arrests him. Tascosa admits the stolen cattle are located in Hidden Valley. The cattle are returned and Chip and Louise ride off on Chip's horse as he sings "The Prairie Is My Home."

Cast  
Dick Foran as Charles Chip Douglas 
Linda Perry as Louise Turner
Wayne Morris as Dave Massey 
Harry Woods as Tascosa
Irene Franklin as Cattle Kate Turner
Frank Orth as Deputy Shorty Long
Gordon Hart as Major Daniel Adair
Cy Kendall as Slade Henaberry
Glenn Strange as 'Bandy' Malarkey
Milton Kibbee as Sheriff Spence 
Edmund Cobb as Mason
Henry Otho as Kirby
 Tom Brower as John Douglas
Paul Panzer as Jim Blake
 Joe King (uncredited) as Governor Lew Wallace

Previous Versions 
This was the third iteration of this story. The first was a 1927 silent of the same title, starring Ken Maynard. The second was 1932's The Big Stampede, with John Wayne and Noah Beery, one of six Warner B-westerns that were all remakes of Maynard silents, utilizing stock footage of the big action scenes (with Wayne wearing the same costume for matching purposes). This version has no footage from the previous two.

References

External links 
 

1937 films
American Western (genre) films
1937 Western (genre) films
Warner Bros. films
Films directed by B. Reeves Eason
American black-and-white films
1930s English-language films
1930s American films